Hypena minualis, the sooty hypena or sooty bomolocha moth, is a moth in the family Erebidae. The species was first described by Achille Guenée in 1854. It is found in North America.

The MONA or Hodges number for Hypena minualis is 8457.

References

Further reading

External links

 

minualis
Articles created by Qbugbot
Moths described in 1854